1st Front may refer to major formations of the Soviet Army during World War II:
 1st Baltic Front
 1st Belorussian Front
 1st Far Eastern Front
 1st Ukrainian Front